Harold P. Boas (born June 26, 1954) is an American mathematician.

Life
Boas was born in Evanston, Illinois, United States. He is the son of two noted mathematicians, Ralph P. Boas, Jr and Mary L. Boas.

Education
He received his A.B. and S.M. degrees in applied mathematics from Harvard University in 1976 and his Ph.D. in mathematics from the Massachusetts Institute of Technology in 1980 under the direction of Norberto Kerzman.

Teaching
Boas was a J. F. Ritt Assistant Professor at Columbia University (1980–1984) before moving to Texas A&M University, where he advanced to the rank of associate professor in 1987 and full professor in 1992. He has held visiting positions at the University of North Carolina at Chapel Hill and the Mathematical Sciences Research Institute in Berkeley, California.

Publications and awards
He has published over thirty papers, including Reflections on the arbelos (for which he won the Chauvenet Prize in 2009), and has also translated several dozen papers and a book from Russian into English. He is a winner of the Lester R. Ford Award (2007) of the Mathematical Association of America and a co-winner of the Stefan Bergman Prize (with Emil J. Straube, 1995) of the American Mathematical Society. In 2012 he became a fellow of the American Mathematical Society.

He revised and updated his father's book A Primer of Real Functions for the fourth edition.

References 

1954 births
Living people
People from Evanston, Illinois
20th-century American mathematicians
21st-century American mathematicians
Complex analysts
Mathematical analysts
Harvard University alumni
Massachusetts Institute of Technology School of Science alumni
Columbia University faculty
Texas A&M University faculty
University of North Carolina at Chapel Hill faculty
Fellows of the American Mathematical Society
Mathematicians from Illinois